Carrie Johnson (born 1988) is the wife of former British prime minister Boris Johnson.

Carrie Johnson may also refer to:
Carrie Johnson (canoeist) (born 1984), American Olympic canoeist
Carrie Johnson (journalist), American journalist
Carrie Ashton Johnson, American suffragist, editor, and author
Caroline Johnson, British politician and doctor